Ceraceopsora is a genus of rust fungi in the Chaconiaceae family. The genus is monotypic, containing the single species Ceraceopsora elaeagni, found in Japan growing on Anemone flaccida and Elaeagnus umbellata.

References

External links
 

Pucciniales
Monotypic Basidiomycota genera
Fungi described in 1984
Fungi of Asia